DXDM (88.7 FM), on-air as 88.7 Happy FM, is a radio station owned and operated by Notre Dame Broadcasting Corporation. It serves as the flagship station of Happy FM. Its studios and transmitter are located at the DXND Bldg., Daang Maharlika, Brgy. Poblacion, Kidapawan.

References

External links
Happy FM Kidapawan FB Page
Brigada News FM Kidapawan Website

Radio stations in Cotabato
Radio stations established in 1992